Kaze Teffo Etienne (born 25 February 1987 in Cameroon) is a Cameroonian former footballer.

Early life

Etienne's main ambition as a child was to be a professional footballer.

Singapore

Adjusting well to life in Singapore, the Cameroonian fullback was regarded as an essential part of Sporting Afrique's lineup,  his reading of the game one of his strengths.

One of Balestier Khalsa's new foreign imports named for the 2007 S.League, Etienne generally performed well for the club, even though he was not a copious scorer.

References

External links 
 at Soccerway

Living people
Association football defenders
Cameroonian footballers
Singapore Premier League players
Cameroonian expatriate sportspeople in Singapore
Expatriate footballers in Singapore
Balestier Khalsa FC players
Cameroonian expatriate sportspeople in the United States
1987 births
Cameroonian expatriate footballers
Expatriate soccer players in the United States
Expatriate footballers in Hungary
Jersey Express S.C. players
Hajdúböszörményi TE footballers